Émile Munhofen (18 August 1898 – 28 July 1983) was a Luxembourgian gymnast. He competed in nine events at the 1924 Summer Olympics.

References

External links
 

1898 births
1983 deaths
Luxembourgian male artistic gymnasts
Olympic gymnasts of Luxembourg
Gymnasts at the 1924 Summer Olympics
Sportspeople from Esch-sur-Alzette
20th-century Luxembourgian people